Matthew Gregory Herr (born May 26, 1976) is an American former professional ice hockey forward who played for part of four National Hockey League (NHL) seasons.

Playing career
Herr was born in Hackensack, New Jersey, and raised in Alpine, New Jersey As a youth, he played in the 1990 Quebec International Pee-Wee Hockey Tournament with the Tri-States Selects minor ice hockey team.

Herr lived in New Windsor, New York as a teenager and played before Newburgh Free Academy's club hockey team while in middle school. He later transferred to The Hotchkiss School in Lakeville, Connecticut, where he was captain of the hockey team.

Herr played his college hockey at the University of Michigan from 1994–98, where he was teammates with future NHL player Bill Muckalt. He helped the Michigan Wolverines win the 1996 and 1998 NCAA Division I Ice Hockey Championships. Herr also pitched for Michigan's baseball team from 1996–98 and was selected out of high school by the Atlanta Braves in the 29th round of the 1994 MLB draft.

Drafted by the Washington Capitals in the 1994 NHL Entry Draft, Herr also played for the Florida Panthers and Boston Bruins. During the 2004–05 NHL lockout, Herr played with the DEG Metro Stars and head coach Butch Goring in the Deutsche Eishockey Liga.

International play
Internationally, Herr competed for the United States men's national junior ice hockey team at the 1996 World Junior Ice Hockey Championships.

Personal
Herr has taught history and psychology, and has coached hockey and baseball at Kent School, in Kent, Connecticut.

Herr became the Executive Director of the UPMC Lemieux Sports Complex in Pittsburgh, Pennsylvania in May 2015. Since 2017, he has worked for the NHL as a Youth Hockey director.

In 2021, Herr became a Head Coach for the Washington Pride U14 Majors. The D.C. area’s only Tier 1 AAA Girls program. He led the team to a 24-20-6 record, and ended the season ranked #25 in the country.

Career statistics

Regular season and playoffs

International

Awards and honors

References

External links

1976 births
Living people
American men's ice hockey centers
Boston Bruins players
DEG Metro Stars players
Florida Panthers players
Hershey Bears players
Hotchkiss School alumni
Ice hockey players from New Jersey
Michigan Wolverines men's ice hockey players
Michigan Wolverines baseball players
People from Alpine, New Jersey
People from New Windsor, New York
Sportspeople from Hackensack, New Jersey
Philadelphia Phantoms players
Portland Pirates players
Providence Bruins players
Washington Capitals draft picks
Washington Capitals players
NCAA men's ice hockey national champions